WNMI-LP (98.7 FM) was a low-power radio station broadcasting a News Talk Information format. Formerly licensed to North Myrtle Beach, South Carolina, United States, the station was owned by City of North Myrtle Beach.

The station's license was surrendered to the Federal Communications Commission (FCC) by the licensee on February 20, 2013, and the license was then cancelled by the FCC on February 22, 2013.

References

External links
 

NMI-LP
NMI-LP
News and talk radio stations in the United States
Horry County, South Carolina
Defunct radio stations in the United States
Radio stations disestablished in 2013
2013 disestablishments in South Carolina
NMI-LP